Andreas Howaldt (21 April 1925 – 5 September 2017) was a German sailor who competed in the 1952 Summer Olympics.

References

1925 births
2017 deaths
German male sailors (sport)
Olympic sailors of Germany
Sailors at the 1952 Summer Olympics – 6 Metre